Mahmud Bayazidi (1797 Doğubeyazıt – 1859 Erzurum), was a Kurdish philosopher and polymath from Bayazid in the Ottoman Empire.

Early life
He was born in Bayazid (present-day Doğubeyazıt in Ağrı Province, Turkey) in 1797. He started his studies by reading the Koran, and then Arabic, Persian, Ottoman and Kurdish. He then moved to Tabriz in north-western Iran to continue his studies. After finishing his studies, he went back to his hometown and became a teacher. After the fall of Kurdish emirates in Bayazid, he moved to Erzurum.

Works
In 1856, the Russian academic A. Dorne, asked A.D. Jaba, the newly appointed Russian consulate in Erzurum, for assistance in analyzing documents in the Kurdish language. Jaba, in turn, employed Mahmud Bayazidi in the field of Kurdish language, history and Culture. With the assistance of Bayazidi, a number of Kurdish documents were sent to the Russian Academy of Sciences in Saint Petersburg, including some of Bayazidi's own writings.  In 1858-1859, Bayazidi, edited the Kurdish-Arabic-Persian grammar book by Ali Taramokhi (Kurdish writer of 15-16th century). He also wrote a book containing 3,000 phrases in Kurdish, which shed light on the life of Kurds in the 19th century. This book was translated into French by A.D. Jaba in 1880. Bayazidi, wrote another book called Habits and Customs of Kurds, which has been published in 1963 by the famous Russian Kurdologist Margarita Rudenko. From the correspondences of A.D. Jaba with Saint Petersburg, it is evident that Bayazidi had written a book about the modern history of the Kurds, covering the period 1785-1858, although this book appears to have been lost, except for the French translation of its preface. Bayazidi and Jaba also played an instrumental role in preserving old Kurdish literature by collecting more than 50 volumes of old hand written Kurdish classic texts and sending them to the Library of Saint Petersburg. These texts which have been preserved until now, include the epics of well known classical poets such as Faqi Tayran, Malaye Bate, Malaye Jaziri and Mem û Zîn (Mam and Zin) by Ahmad Khani. This collection was finally published in 1961 by M.B. Rudenko, titled About the hand-written Kurdish texts in Leningrad.

During the period 1858-1859, Mahmud Bayazidi and A.D. Jaba, wrote the first Kurdish-French and French-Kurdish dictionary, published in 1879. During the same period, Mahmud Bayazidi, translated the Sharafnama (history of the Kurdish nation) from Persian into Kurdish. This is considered to be the first Kurdish history book in modern times. Its hand-written version is preserved in the Russian National Library. It was published for the first time in 1986.

Published books
Bayazidi, Mahmud, Mem û Zîn (Mem and Zin), an abstract of Ahmad Khani's poem, Kurmanji version with French translation by Alexandre Jaba, introduced by Hakem, Helkewt, Debireh, no 5, Paris, 1989.
Bayazidi, Mela Mahmud, 'Adat u rasumatname-ye Akradiye, ("Habits and customs of Kurds"), original manuscript (Kurmandjî in Ottoman characters), published by M. B. Rudenko, with an introduction and Russian translation : Nravy i Obycaj Kurdov, Moscow, 1963.
Mela Mahmud Bayazidi, Tawarikh-i Qadim-i Kurdistan ; perevod Saraf-Khana Bidlisi s persidskogo âzyka na kurdskij âzyk ; izdanie teksta, predislovie, ukazateli i oglavlenie K. K. Kurdoeva i Z. S. Musaélân Megjelenés: Moskva : Nauka, 1986. (Kurdish translation of Sharafnama by Sharaf al-Din Khan Bidlisi)

References
Mela Mehmûdê Bazîdî, Classical Kurdish Literature (in Kurdish)
Modern Kurdish Artistic Prose, By: Farhad Shakely, Uppsala university, Sweden
J. Musaelian. On the First Kurdish Edition of the Sharaf nama by Mullâ (Mela) Mahmud Bayazidi, International Journal for Oriental Manuscript Research, Vol.5, No. 4 December  1999.
J. S. Musaelyan. Mela Mahmud Bayazidi and His First Translation of Sharaf-name by Sharaf-khan Bidlisi into the Kurdish Language,

Kurdish people from the Ottoman Empire
People from Doğubayazıt
Kurdish-language writers
1797 births
1859 deaths
Kurdish historians
Kurdish scholars
Kurdish philosophers
18th-century Kurdish people
19th-century Kurdish people